Trentino, officially the Autonomous Province of Trento, is an autonomous province of Italy, in the country's far north. The Trentino and South Tyrol constitute the region of Trentino-Alto Adige/Südtirol, an autonomous region under the constitution. The province is composed of 166 comuni (municipalities). Its capital is the city of Trento (Trent). Trentino is renowned for its mountains, such as the Dolomites, which are part of the Alps.

Etymology 
The province is generally known as "Trentino". The name derives from Trento, the capital city of the province. Originally, the term was used by the local population only to refer to the city and its immediate surroundings. Under former Austrian rule, which began in the 19th century (previously, Trentino was governed by the local bishop), the common German name for the region was Welschtirol or Welschsüdtirol (‘Italian South Tyrol’), or just Südtirol, meaning South Tyrol with reference to its geographic position as the southern part of Tyrol.

The corresponding Italian name was Tirolo Meridionale, which was historically used to describe the wider southern part of the County of Tyrol, specifically Trentino and sometimes also today's South Tyrol, or Tirolo Italiano. In its wider sense, Trentino was first used around 1848 in an article by a member of the Frankfurt National Assembly; it became a popular term among leftist intellectual circles in Austria.

Since the new 1972 autonomous status, the administrative name of the province is Autonomous Province of Trento.

History 

The history of Trentino begins in the mid-Stone Age. The valleys of what is now Trentino were already inhabited by man, the main settlements being in the valley of the Adige River, thanks to its milder climate.

In the early Middle Ages, this area was included within the Kingdom of Italy and the March of Verona. In 1027, the Bishopric of Trent was established as a State of the Holy Roman Empire by Emperor Conrad II. It was an ecclesiastical territory, roughly corresponding to the present-day Trentino, governed by the Prince-Bishops of Trento.

The Council of Trent, held in three major sessions from 1545 to 1563, with the first at Trento, was one of the important councils in the history of the Roman Catholic Church. It was an articulation of Roman Catholic doctrine in response to the Protestant Reformation, and specified doctrine on salvation, the sacraments, and the Biblical canon.

After the Napoleonic Wars of the early 19th century, the bishopric was secularized and absorbed into the Austrian County of Tyrol. It was governed by the House of Habsburg-Lorraine. The region was the location of heavy fighting during World War I, as it was directly on the front lines between Austria-Hungary and Italy. Trentino was occupied by Italy in November 1918 and was annexed in 1919 by the Kingdom of Italy in the Treaty of Saint-Germain-en-Laye.

After World War II, the Italian and Austrian Foreign Ministers signed the Gruber-De Gasperi Agreement, creating the autonomous region of Trentino-South Tyrol, consisting of the autonomous provinces of Trentino and South Tyrol. Since the treaty, Trentino has enjoyed considerable autonomy from the Italian central government in Rome. It has its own elected government and legislative assembly.

In 1996, the Euroregion Tyrol-South Tyrol-Trentino was formed between the Austrian state of Tyrol and the Italian provinces of South Tyrol and Trentino. The boundaries of the association correspond to the old County of Tyrol. The aim is to promote regional peace, understanding and cooperation in many areas. The region's assemblies meet together as one on various occasions and have set up a common liaison office to the European Union in Brussels.

Geography 

Trentino is a mountainous region. The Adige River flows through the central Trentino in a valley named after the river. The principal towns of Trentino lie in the Adige Valley, which has been a historical passage connecting Italy with Northern Europe. Among other important valleys are Non Valley, known for its apple production, Sole Valley, Giudicarie, which has been historically connected by Trento and Brescia, Fiemme and Fassa, Lagarina, Mocheni, Sugana Valley and many others.

There are 217 comuni (singular: comune), in the province.

The glacier on the Marmolada is also a landmark. Other high mountains include the Monte Baldo, Carè Alto, Cermis, Crozzon di Brenta, Hintere Eggenspitze, Latemar, Paganella, Piz Boè, Presanella, Punta San Matteo and Vezzana.

Politics 
The 1972 second Statute of Autonomy for Trentino-Alto Adige/Südtirol devolved most legislative and executive competences from the regional level to the provincial level, creating de facto two separate regions. Administratively, the province enjoys a large degree of autonomy in the following sectors: health, education, welfare and transport infrastructure. The provincial council comprises 35 members, one of whom must by law be drawn from the Ladin minority.

In the elections in 2013, the strongest party became the Democratic Party (Partito Democratico del Trentino) with 9 deputies, Trentino Tyrolean Autonomist Party (8), Union for Trentino (5), Lega Nord Trentino (2), Forza Italia (1), Five Stars Movement (1), Trentino Project (1), Ladin Autonomist Union (1), Civic Trentino (1), Administer Trentino (1), with one independent.

The executive powers are attributed to the provincial government (Italian: Giunta Provinciale), headed by the governor (Presidente). Since 2018 the governor is Maurizio Fugatti of the rightist Lega Nord. The president of the provincial council alternates with the governor of South Tyrol as president of the Trentino-South Tyrol region. The regional government has its seat in the former Hotel Imperial in Trento.

The Ladin community has one reserved seat in the provincial assembly and is thereby guaranteed political representation.

Administration 

Due to the division of the province into the 217 municipalities (Comuni/Gemeinden), often of small or even tiny size, in the late 1970s, eleven larger units known as districts (comprensori) were introduced. The municipalities forming a district elect the council for that district. However, this tier of government has provoked criticism, and, in 2006, a reform created fifteen more homogeneous "Valley Communities" (comunità di valle, Talgemeinden) and one territory including the municipalities of Trento, Cimone, Aldeno and Garniga Terme (see Municipalities of Trentino).

As of 2009, the only municipalities with a population over 20,000 were Trento, Rovereto, and Pergine Valsugana.

Economy 

The Gross domestic product (GDP) of the region was 20.5 billion euros in 2018, accounting for 1.2% of Italy's economic output. GDP per capita adjusted for purchasing power was 37,900 euros or 126% of the EU27 average in the same year. The GDP per employee was 119% of the EU average.

Despite the overwhelmingly mountainous nature of the territory, agriculture remains important. Farms often join to form larger cooperatives. The most important produce comprises apples (50% of national production, together with South Tyrol) and other fruit, vegetables (primarily in the Val di Gresta), and grapes. Important especially for their quality, the latter are used for the production of dry and sparkling wines.

In January 2008, the Edmund Mach Foundation was established to promote research, training and services in the agricultural, agri-food and environmental fields.

The primary industries, often small and medium-sized, are concentrated in Valsugana, Vallagarina and the Adige Valleys. Sectors include textiles, mechanics, wood and paper productions. Also important is the production of hydro-electric energy.

Tourism is the mainstay of the provincial economy. The main resorts include: Madonna di Campiglio, San Martino di Castrozza, Fiera di Primiero, Canazei, Moena, Cavalese, Folgaria, Folgarida-Marilleva, Riva del Garda and Levico Terme, Comano Terme and Roncegno, these last three being renowned thermal stations.

The unemployment rate stood at 5.3% in 2020.

Transport 

The Trentino province is crossed by the main road and rail connections between Italy and Germany. These include the Brenner A22 motorway and road which passes through the Etsch/Adige Valley. A regional project of switching much of the road traffic to railways is currently under consideration.

The province has two more railways: the Valsugana Line, connecting Trento to Venice and the Trento-Malè-Marilleva railway between Trento and Malè.

Demographics 
In 2019 the population of Trentino was 541,098. The highest concentration of the population is located around the capital city of Trento, and the southern parts. The whole region is divided up into 175 municipalities.

Languages 

The majority of the Trentino population is Italian-speaking with its local dialects. The region is also home to three indigenous linguistic minorities, which are Ladin, Mócheno and Cimbrian. All languages are protected by regional and provincial laws, statutes, and regulations.

After World War II and the devolution of power to regional authorities, a change in policy slowly began, which gained momentum in the 1990s. Since then a number of far-reaching laws and regulations have been passed and implemented, that protect and promote the use of these three languages and the unique cultural heritage and identity. This has for example been extended to school curricula in the regional languages and street signs becoming bilingual. All three minorities have their own cultural institute which were decreed by national law and receive state funds. The purpose of these cultural institutes is to safeguard and promote the respective culture and languages.

The Ladin minority is found in the Fassa Valley, in the municipalities of Canazei (Cianacei), Campitello di Fassa (Ciampedèl), Mazzin (Mazin), Moena, Soraga and Sèn Jan di Fassa. In the census of 2001, 16,462 inhabitants of Trentino declared Ladin as their native language.

Mócheno is still spoken in the municipalities of Frassilongo (Garait), Palù del Fersina (Palai en Bersntol) and Fierozzo (Vlarötz), while the Cimbrian language is spoken in Luserna (Lusérn). The 2001 census found there were 2,276 native Mócheno and 882 Cimbrian speakers. The linguistic breakdown according to the census of 2001 is:

The Nones language hails from the Non Valley and is considered by some linguists a variant of Ladin. Estimates range up to 30,000 speakers. The Solandro language is also under debate as to whether it is a dialect of Ladin or a separate language. Native speakers are mainly found in the Sole Valley and are estimated to be up to 15,000. Both idioms are alternatively considered as dialects within the range of Gallo-Romance languages. There is no official census to date that has Nones and Solandro as officially distinct languages. The total number of Ladin speakers in the census of 2001 exceeds the population of around 7,500 in the Fassa Valley. A number of Nones and Solandro speakers identified as Ladin speakers, while others chose not to exercise that option due to the disagreement whether or not their languages are Ladin or a separate idiom.

Culture 

The Trentino is a region of cultural encounters. Already in the past Germans, Italians and Ladins joined in this area. The alpine province is a piece of land, in which mountain passes and elevated plains join hilly valleys and plains and in which different people and cultures join. Its history, but also the relatively insular geographic position of some valleys led to an extraordinary richness in culture and many customs and traditions that have been kept alive up to the present. Also some minority groups and gastronomic peculiarities have been preserved till now.

Museums 
In the territory of the Province there are numerous museums, which have had significant development over the last twenty years by the financial resources of the Province. Among the main ones:

 the modern and contemporary art museum of Trento and Rovereto (MART), inaugurated in 2002, based in Corso Bettini in Rovereto. The modern architectural structure was designed by Mario Botta and fits harmoniously into the historical fabric of the city. MART can boast an extensive permanent collection of contemporary works and aims to take on an increasingly international dimension.
 The Civic Museum of Rovereto, founded in 1851 and among the oldest Italian museums;
 the Buonconsiglio museum near the castle of the same name and the Historical Museum in Trento in via Torre d'Augusto;
 the Tridentine Museum of Natural Sciences, located in Trento;
 the aeronautics museum, dedicated to Gianni Caproni (based in Mattarello);
 the museum of the uses and customs of the Trentino people, one of the major ethnographic and material culture museums of the entire Alpine area, with headquarters in San Michele all'Adige;
 the Italian historical museum of the War of Rovereto, dedicated to the First World War, hosted at the city's castle.
 the geological museum of the Dolomites in Predazzo
 Padre Kino Museum located in Segno in the Val di Non chronicles the life of missionary explorer Eusebio Kino and the indigenous people of today's borderlands of Arizona and Sonora.

Also worthy of note are the cultural institutes and museums dedicated to the three minorities of the Province, the Istitut cultural Ladin "majon di fascegn" in Val di Fassa and the "Kulturinstitut Bersntol - Lusérn" for the promotion of German-speaking minorities mòchene and Cimbre.

Castles 
In the region there are numerous castles. With the financial aid of Province, some of them could be restored and are now open to the public. Here the most important:

 Castel del Buonconsiglio , in Trento;
 Castel Thun, in the Val di Non;
 Castel Stenico, in the Vallagarina;
 Castel Beseno, in the Adige Valley;
 Castel Toblino, in the Valle del Sarca;
 Castel Cles, near Cles in the Val di Non;
 Arco Castle, in Arco.

Sports and recreation 

The region offers many opportunities for mountain climbing and trekking and winter sports. Important winter events are the world championships organised by the International Ski Federation (FSI) such as the Nordic ski 1991, 2003 and 2013, snowboarding 2001 and freestyle ski championship 2007, as well as the Adamello Ski Raid and Marcialonga. The Tour de Ski has since 2007 had its conclusion in Val di Fiemme with the Final Climb stage up the alpine skiing course on Alpe Cermis.

During the spring and summer, cycling is a big event in the region, such as the Giro del Trentino and Maratona dles Dolomites over the mountain passes. Cross country racing such as the Cross della Vallagarina and the 10-kilometre road running competition Giro al Sas also take place.

Association football is a popular ball sport in Trentino. Teams within the region are U.S. Alta Vallagarina, A.C. Mezzocorona, A.S.D. Porfido Albiano and Trento Calcio 1921.

Trentino Volley is a professional Italian volleyball team. It has played in the Italian Volleyball League without interruption since 2000, while Aquila Trento is a basketball team in the Italian top league.

See also 
Tyrol
History of Tyrol
Trentino-South Tyrol
Novella, Trentino

References

External links 
 
 Official homepage of the provincial administration
 Official tourism infopage of Trentino
 Protection, conservation and promotion of archaeological heritage in the Trentino region

 
Trentino